Theobald Bourke, 3rd Viscount Mayo (died 15 January 1653) was an Irish soldier, landowner, member of the Irish House of Commons, and peer. As Viscount Mayo in the peerage of Ireland, he had a seat in the Irish House of Lords from 1649 until his death.

Life 
The son and heir of Miles Burke, 2nd Viscount Mayo, by his first wife Honora, Bourke was reported to have been educated at Oxford, which at the time was open only to Anglicans. Like his father, he was said to have been created a Baronet (Scotland) about 1638. As Sir Theobald Bourke, he was one of the two Members of Parliament for County Mayo from 1640 to 1649, when he succeeded his father in the Lords; he distinguished himself in the Royal cause during the Wars of the Three Kingdoms.

He married twice: firstly after September 1634, Elizabeth Talbot, daughter of Thomas Talbot and Anne Fleetwood; secondly Eleanor, daughter of Sir Luke FitzGerald, of Tecroghan, County Meath, by Mary, daughter of Nicholas, 1st Viscount Netterville.

His daughter Maud married Colonel John Browne who built the first Westport House.

Execution 
In December 1652, Mayo was found guilty by Cromwell's High Court of Justice in Connaught, of murders committed in the 'late rebellion', and was “ shot to death,” 15 January I652/3, at Galway, and buried there. His widow died in 1693.

Arms

References 

Members of the Parliament of Ireland (pre-1801) for County Mayo constituencies
Bourke
Irish MPs 1639–1649
House of Burgh
17th-century Irish politicians
Viscounts in the Peerage of Ireland
People executed for murder
1650s deaths